National Route 28 is a national highway in South Korea connects Yeongju to Pohang. It established on 31 August 1971.

Main stopovers
North Gyeongsang Province
 Yeongju - Yecheon County - Uiseong County - Gunwi County - Yeongcheon - Gyeongju - Pohang

Major intersections

 (■): Motorway
IS: Intersection, IC: Interchange

North Gyeongsang Province

References

28
Roads in North Gyeongsang